Ribbons of shame usually refers to a Japanese management practice of giving ribbons with criticisms to those employees who fail to meet the expectations of the management. According to some authors that in Japanese Management Programs, employees participating in truth exercises would declare those weaknesses which have been known to cause errors in the past. It is also a part of Kanrisha Yosei's Japanese management training class.

In popular culture
The term Ribbons of Shame was popularized by the 1986 movie Gung Ho, starring Michael Keaton.

References

Japanese culture
Punishments
Ribbon symbolism